Amarante Futebol Clube (abbreviated as Amarante FC) is a Portuguese football club based in Amarante in the district of Porto.

Background
Amarante FC currently plays in the Campeonato de Portugal which is the fourth tier of Portuguese football. The club was founded in 1923 and they play their home matches at the Municipal de Amarante in Amarante. The stadium is able to accommodate 16,800 spectators and was constructed in 1978.

The club is affiliated to Associação de Futebol do Porto and has competed in the AF Porto Taça. The club has also entered the national cup competition known as Taça de Portugal on many occasions.

Season to season

Current squad

Honours
Portuguese Third Division: 2007/08, 2010/11
AF Porto Divisão de Honra: 2005/06

Notable former managers
 Acácio Casimiro

References

External links
Amarante FC 

Football clubs in Portugal
Association football clubs established in 1923
1923 establishments in Portugal
Sport in Amarante, Portugal